"Still Got the Blues (For You)" is a song by Northern Irish guitarist Gary Moore. It was originally released as the title track of the album Still Got the Blues. The song was released as a single and reached number 31 on the UK Singles Chart in May 1990. It is the only single of Moore's solo career to chart on the US Billboard Hot 100, where it reached number 97 on 16 February 1991. Moore played his Les Paul Standard Guitar throughout the song. He also filmed a basic music video for the song.

The song was covered by Eric Clapton on his 2013 album Old Sock as a tribute to Moore following his death in 2011.

Plagiarism case
On 3 December 2008 a Munich, Germany court ruled that the guitar solo on the song was plagiarized from a 1974 instrumental recording called "Nordrach" (named after Nordrach, a small river in the central Black Forest) by the German progressive rock band Jud's Gallery from Offenburg. Moore denied knowing of the song, due to its unavailability on record or CD at the time of studio work on his album; the court stated that the song could have been heard on the radio or in a live performance during that time. The court also stated that there was no evidence that the guitar solo was lifted from "Nordrach", but copyright infringement does not depend on outright theft. Moore was ordered to pay Jürgen Winter, leader of Jud's Gallery, an undisclosed amount in damages.

Track listing
"Still Got the Blues (For You)" - 4:12
"Left Me with the Blues" - 3:04

Personnel
 Gary Moore - lead vocals, lead and rhythm guitars
 Don Airey - keyboards
 Gavyn Wright - strings
 Andy Pyle - bass guitar
 Graham Walker - drums

Charts

Weekly charts

Year-end charts

References 

Gary Moore songs
1990 singles
Songs written by Gary Moore
1990 songs
Rock ballads
Virgin Records singles